The 2022 Ladies' National Football League, known for sponsorship reasons as the Lidl Ladies' National Football League, is a ladies' Gaelic football competition taking place in spring 2022.

It continued the structure of 2021, where the divisions were split into north and south sections. London will return to the league after several years' absence.

 were the winners.

League structure 
The 2022 Ladies' National Football League consists of four divisions of eight teams. Each division is divided into an "A" and "B" section with four teams in each section. Each team plays every other team in its section once. 3 points are awarded for a win and 1 for a draw.

Tiebreakers for league ranking 
If two teams are level on points, the tie-break is:
 winners of the head-to-head game are ranked ahead
 if the head-to-head match was a draw, then whichever team scored more points in the game is ranked ahead (e.g. 1-15 beats 2–12)
 if the head-to-head match was an exact draw, ranking is determined by the points difference (i.e. total scored minus total conceded in all games)
 if the points difference is equal, ranking is determined by the total scored

If three or more teams are level on league points, rankings are determined solely by points difference.

Finals, promotions and relegations 
The top two teams in each section in Division 1 contest the Ladies' National Football League semi-finals.

The top two teams in each section in divisions 2, 3 and 4 contest the semi-finals of their respective divisions. The division champions are promoted.

The last-placed teams in each section in divisions 1, 2 and 3 play a relegation playoff against each other, with the losers relegated.

Division 1

Division 1A

Table

Division 1B

Table

Division 1 Relegation Playoff

Division 1 Finals

Division 2

Division 2A

Table

Division 2B

Table

Division 2 Relegation Playoff

Division 2 Finals

Division 3

Division 3A

Table

Division 3B

Table

Division 3 Relegation Playoff

Division 3 Finals

Division 4

Division 4A

Table

Division 4B

Table

Division 4 Finals

References

Ladies' National Football League
Ladies' National Football League seasons
Football